The 1946–47 Boston Bruins season was the Bruins' 23rd season in the NHL.

Offseason

Regular season
On February 12, 1947, Dit Clapper played his final game with the Boston Bruins. Before the start of the game, Clapper was inducted into the Hockey Hall of Fame. He was the only active player to be inducted into the Hall.

Final standings

Record vs. opponents

Schedule and results

Playoffs

Player statistics

Regular season
Scoring

Goaltending

Playoffs
Scoring

Goaltending

Awards and records

Transactions

See also
1946–47 NHL season

References

External links

Boston Bruins season, 1946-47
Boston Bruins season, 1946-47
Boston Bruins seasons
Boston
Boston
1940s in Boston